Eli Young Band is an American country music band. Their discography comprises six studio albums, one live album, one compilation album, two extended plays, and sixteen singles.

Albums

Studio albums

Live albums

Compilation albums

Extended plays

Singles

As lead artist

As featured artist

Other charted songs

Music videos

Notes

References 

Country music discographies
Discographies of American artists